Santosham is a 1955 Telugu-language drama film, produced by M. Somasundaram under the Jupiter Pictures banner and directed by C. P. Deekshith. The film stars N. T. Rama Rao, Anjali Devi and Jamuna, with music composed by Viswanathan–Ramamoorthy. It is a remake of the Tamil film Velaikari (1949) and it was simultaneously made in Hindi as Naya Aadmi (1956).

Plot 
Zamindar Dayanidhi (R. Nagendra Rao) a deceitful vicious miser whose profession is to take advantage of the destitute by giving loans and taking the authority on them. Unable to repay the money he has borrowed from Zamindar for his son Anand's (N.T.Rama Rao) higher studies, Sundaraiah (Vadlamani Viswanathan) commits suicide. A depressed Anand makes an aborted bid to kill the Zamindar and on the same night, he along with his friend Madan Mohan (Jaggaiah) stumble upon the corpse of an England-returned rich young man Paramanand (again N. T. Rama Rao), who resembles Anand. On Mohan's advice, Anand takes his place. The dead man's blind mother (Kakinada Rajaratnam) believes that Anand is her son and performs his marriage with Dayanidhi's class-conscious daughter Sarasa (Jamuna). Dayanidhi objects to his son Murthy (Ramasarma) marrying their servant-maid Amrutham (Anjali Devi) and tries to kill her by torching her hut. How Anand saves Amrutham, tames Sarasa and brings in a change of heart in Dayanidhi forms the rest of the story.

Cast 
 N. T. Rama Rao as Anand & Paramanand (dual role)
 Anjali Devi as Amrutham
 Jamuna as Sarasa
 Jaggayya as Mohan
 R. Nagendra Rao as Dayanidhi
 Relangi as Parvathalu
 Vangara as Pullayya
 Chadalavada as Avatharam
 Vadlamani Viswanatham as Sundarayya
 Rama Sharma as Murthy
 K.V.S. Sharma as Public Prosecutor
 Rajasulochana as Santhi Kumar
 Rajaratnam as Radhabai
 Kamalabai as Gangaratnam
 Ragini as Dancer
 Helen as Dancer

Soundtrack 

Music composed by Viswanathan–Ramamoorthy. Lyrics were written by Samudrala Sr-Samudrala Jr.

References

External links 
 

1950s Telugu-language films
Films scored by Viswanathan–Ramamoorthy
Indian black-and-white films
Indian drama films
Telugu remakes of Tamil films
1955 drama films